The Cherokee Southwest Township (CSWT) in Albuquerque, New Mexico, is a large group of Cherokee families enrolled with the Cherokee Nation of Oklahoma. It is not a so-called Cherokee heritage group, but a satellite of the main tribal jurisdiction.

All of the township members originated in Eastern Oklahoma and migrated to New Mexico and are members of either the Cherokee Nation or United Keetoowah Band of Cherokee Indians. The township incorporated under the Cherokee Nation as a Cherokee Township for Cherokee Nation citizens who migrated to New Mexico during the Oklahoma dust bowl in the 1930s (the same migration wave that Cherokee migrant Florence Owens Thompson was part of).

The township has monthly meetings and hosts Cherokee language and history classes. The Albuquerque Cherokee Township has a significant number of native Cherokee speakers.  Former principal chief Chad "Corntassel" Smith visited the township four times per year.

See also
Cherokee heritage groups
Cherokees in Texas
Cherokees in Mexico
Northern Cherokee of the Great Plains (the historic Louisiana Territory)

References

External links
Cherokee Southwest Township (CSWT) — Cherokee Nation website
Cherokee Southwest Township celebrates culture, Cherokee Phoenix

Cherokee Nation
Culture of Albuquerque, New Mexico
Native American history of New Mexico
Native Americans in Albuquerque, New Mexico
United Keetoowah Band of Cherokee Indians
Cherokee-speaking countries and territories
Cherokee towns